Army Slavic was a rump vocabulary consisting of about eighty key words, mostly of Czech origin. It was developed to help overcome language barriers in Austria-Hungary and was in use until the end of World War I.

Part of the reason for the existence of this specialized vocabulary was the fact that, while German and Hungarian were official languages, half of the soldiery was recruited from areas that spoke various Slavic languages. In all, there were eleven different official languages to contend with. While efforts were made to keep soldiers grouped by language, mixed language units still occurred.

References

Scheer, Tamara (2020), Language diversity and loyalty in the Habsburg army, 1868-1918, Habilitation Thesis, University of Vienna, online https://utheses.univie.ac.at/detail/57914#, p. 184.

See also 
 
 Controlled natural language

Military of Austria-Hungary
Simplified languages
Constructed languages introduced in the 19th century
Military pidgins
Languages extinct in the 1910s